Jean-Luc Petitrenaud (born 1950) is a French food critic and television personality. In June 2017, he announced that he would be taking a short break from hosting his television show Les escapades de Petitrenaud due to fatigue.

References

Living people
1950 births
Writers from Clermont-Ferrand